Alison Watt may refer to:

 Alison Watt (Scottish painter) (born 1965)
 Alison Watt (writer) (born 1957), Canadian, writer, and painter